The Metropolitanate of Tourkia was an Eastern Orthodox diocese (eparchy) in the Medieval Hungary, during the 11th and 12th centuries. Its name was derived from the term Tourkia (Turkey), used by the Byzantine Empire as a designation for the Hungarian medieval state. Since the Metropolitanate of Tourkia was created under the auspices of the Patriarchate of Constantinople, the common Byzantine term for the country was also applied to the newly created eparchy. According to some modern scholars, the Metropolitanate of Tourkia had jurisdiction over Eastern Orthodox ecclesiastic system throughout the Kingdom of Hungary.

Bishop of Tourkia 

The Magyars (or Hungarians) invaded the Carpathian Basin in 895 or 896. They settled in the lowlands along the Middle Danube and consolidated their authority in the region during the subsequent decades. Contemporaneous Byzantine authors referred to them as Tourkoi (Turks) and to their land as Tourkia (Turkey) in the 10th century. The Hungarians were pagans, described as star- and fire-worshipers by Muslim geographers. In search for booty, they made regular raids, primarily against Western Europe in the early 10th century. They also invaded the Balkan territories of the Byzantine Empire in 934 and 943, forcing the Byzantines to sign a peace treaty. One of the Hungarians' principal military commanders, the Karhas Bulcsú, was baptised in Constantinople in 948. Bulcsú's conversion was not sincere and he launched new plundering raids against the Byzantine Empire in the early 950s.

The second-ranked Hungarian chieftain, Gylas, received baptism in Constantinople around 952. The Byzantine Emperor Constantine VII Porphyrogenitus rewarded him with the honorary title of patrikios, entitling him to a yearly subsidy. The Ecumenical Patriarch tasked a monk, Hierotheos, with the conversion of Gylas' subjects and consecrated him bishop. Hierotheos accompanied Gylas back to his realm where he converted many Hungarians, according to the Byzantine historian John Skylitzes. Porphyrogenitus associated Tourkia with lands to the east of the river Tisza in one of his books written around the same time. Finds of 10th-century Byzantine coins, earrings, reliquary crosses and similar artefacts abound in the region of Szeged. Both facts imply that Gylas' domains were located near the confluence of the Tisza and Maros, but this interpretation is not universally accepted by modern historians.

Metropolitan of Tourkia 
One "Ioannes [John], metropolitan of Tourkia" attended the synod convoked by the Ecumenical Patriarch to Constantinople in 1028. At the list of the participants, Ioannes was mentioned as the last among the metropolitans, showing that his see had been recently established or elevated to the rank of metropolitanate. A 12th-century register of the dioceses subject to Constantinople lists the metropolitanate of Tourkia at the 60th entry, only followed by the metropolitanate of Rhôsia (or Kievan Rus'). A seal of Antonios, synkellos of Tourkia also dates to the 11th century.

See also 
 History of Christianity in Hungary
 Eastern Orthodoxy in Hungary

References

Sources 

 
 
 
 
 
 
 
 

 
 

Eastern Orthodoxy in Hungary
Tourkia
11th century in Hungary
12th century in Hungary